The Miramichi Folksong Festival, is the oldest folk music festival in Canada. It is held annually in Miramichi, New Brunswick, Canada. It was established by Louise Manny in response to a request from Lord Beaverbrook that she document the traditional songs of his boyhood home. It is the longest continuous event of its kind in Canada and one of the longest in North America. The first festival was held in September 1958 at the Beaverbrook Town Hall and Theatre in Newcastle, New Brunswick. The festival is still held at this location, now in August of each year.

Although the festival now is an important draw for local tourism, and features some mainstream talent, the original and primary purpose of the festival is to preserve local culture; thus, highlights of the festival include many amateur, often elderly, local performers.  

Traditional lyrics and music highlighted by the festival have been preserved in the 1968 book Songs of Miramichi and in several recordings, including a 1962 Folkways Records album produced by Louise Manny.

Allan Kelly (September 23, 1903- October 1, 2008) was one of the most popular singers and ardent supporters of the Festival. One of his earliest performances, The Petit Moine, is recorded on the 1962 album.

Raymond and Frank Estey, brothers from Sevogle N.B, sang each year. Afterword, the Esteys entertained the crowd by telling their famous ghost stories.

References

Further reading
Underhill, Doug (1999). "Miramichi Folksong Festival: A living museum" in Miramichi Tales - Tall & True. Saint John, NB. Neptune Publishing Company, pp. 76–85.

Miramichi, New Brunswick
Music festivals in New Brunswick
Folk festivals in Canada
New Brunswick music
Recurring events established in 1958
Tourist attractions in Northumberland County, New Brunswick
Traditional music
Amateurism
1958 establishments in New Brunswick